The Flag Officer Sea Training (FOST) is a training organisation in the Indian Navy. FOST is the authority responsible for the operational sea training of all personnel of Indian Naval and Coast Guard ships and submarines. The organisation was instituted in 1992 and is the common authority to maintain battle efficiency standards. It also provides training to navies and maritime security forces of friendly foreign countries (FFC). Headquartered in Kochi, the FOST operates under the control of the Flag Officer Commanding-in-Chief Southern Naval Command.

History
In October 1977, an organisation called the Weapons workup organisation (WWO) was set up. This was aimed at increasing the efficiency of ships' weapons. In 1981, it was re-designated Warship Workup Organisation in Bombay. An additional WWO was set up in Vizag - WWO (V) - for the Eastern Fleet. In March 1992, a local flotilla workup team (LWT) was set up for the ships operating under the Maharashtra Naval Area. These three organisations - WWO (B), WWO (V) and LWT - reported into the Flag Officer Commanding Western Fleet (FOCWF), Flag Officer Commanding Eastern Fleet (FOCEF) and Flag Officer Maharashtra Area (FOMA) respectively.

In 1992, a single authority was created to consolidate work-up efforts and serve as the safety authority responsible for the operational sea training (OST) of all ships. The organisation would be headed by a rear admiral of the executive branch and be based out of Kochi. As the Southern Naval Command (SNC) was the training command of the Navy, the FOST would report into the FOC-in-C SNC. An Indian Navy Workup Team (INWT) was created at Kochi and local workup units were created at Bombay and Vizag - LWT (West) and LWT (East).

On 4 June 1993, the first ship was trained by FOST - the Khukri-class corvette . In 2000, the Sukanya-class patrol vessel  was sold to the Sri Lanka Navy. She was commissioned as SLNS Sayura in November 2000. The Sayura was the first foreign ship whose operational sea training was conducted by INWT and FOST.

Structure
The INWT at Kochi works up all major warships - Aircraft Carriers, Anti-submarine warfare and Guided-missile destroyers, frigates and other fleet units. The INWT is under the operational control of FOST and administrative control of FOC-in-C SNC.
The LWT (West) and LWT (East) work up Seaward-class defense boats, missile boats, Anti Submarine Patrol Vessels, Ocean-going tugs, etc. They are under the operational control of FOST and administrative control of FOC-in-C of Western Naval Command and Eastern Naval Command respectively.

Training regime
The FOST conducts multiple types of training which encompasses all spheres of ship activity. There are short training programs like the Sea Safety Checks (SSC) and Operational Sea Checks (OSC) for a duration of 7 – 10 days on selected disciplines like Bridge Work, Damage Control and Fire Fighting, Machinery Breakdown Drills and Ship Safety.

It also conducts full work-up programs, under the ambit of OST, from three weeks (for minor war vessels) to six weeks (for aircraft carriers). It ensures a thorough training of the ship to achieve the prescribed performance standards. On completion, it conducts an operational readiness assessment at sea and certifies the ships operational status and the areas of improvement. The OST covers all operational/combat functions - aviation, ship management, hull, seamanship, NBCD, engineering, electrical, logistics and medical.

List of FOST

See also
 Southern Naval Command

References

Bibliography
 
 

Indian Navy
Naval units and formations of India
Indian military appointments
Indian Navy appointments